The yellow-rumped flowerpecker (Prionochilus xanthopygius) is a species of bird in the family Dicaeidae. It is found in Brunei, Indonesia, and Malaysia on the island of Borneo, to which it is endemic. Its natural habitats are subtropical or tropical moist lowland forests and subtropical or tropical moist montane forests.

References

yellow-rumped flowerpecker
Birds of East Malaysia
Endemic birds of Borneo
yellow-rumped flowerpecker
Taxonomy articles created by Polbot